Humbert or Hunbert (died 9 March 842) was the bishop of Würzburg from 833 until his death. Although he was resident in Würzburg from 815, Humbert seems to have been a suffragan bishop of the archdiocese of Mainz without a see of his own before he was appointed to succeed Wolfgar at Würzburg in 833.

Humbert was a friend and correspondent of Hraban Maur, whose biblical commentaries he greatly admired. He sent a large supply of parchment to Fulda Abbey to have copies made of some of Hraban's books for his cathedral's library. He also acquired biblical manuscripts and some commentaries by Bede.

Notes

Sources

Roman Catholic bishops of Würzburg
842 deaths
Year of birth unknown